The following lists events that happened during 1924 in the Weimar Republic.

Incumbents

National level
President
Friedrich Ebert (Social Democrats)
Chancellor
Wilhelm Marx (1st term) (Centre)

Events
 4 January – The Emminger Reform is enacted that abolished the jury system and replaced it with a mixed system of judges and lay judges.
 31 January – Leaders of independent republic of the Rhineland Palatinate attempting to formally secede from Germany fails from lack of support.
 23 February – Great Britain reduces German reparation recovery duties on German goods to 5% due to Germany's economic troubles.
 26 February – The trial of Adolf Hitler for the Beer Hall Putsch begins and will last until 1 April.
 3 March – Germany signs a treaty of friendship with Turkey.
 4 May – German federal election, May 1924
 26 May – Wilhelm Marx's government resigns after negotiations breakdown for a coalition.
 6 June – Germany accepts Dawes Plan, a US plan to help solve German debt.
 16 August – Representatives of the French government agree to leave the Ruhr in the Occupation of the Ruhr during the London Conference of World War I reparations.
 29 August – The German Reichstag approves the Dawes Plan for the reduction of World War I reparations.
 30 August – The German Reichsbank begins operating independent of the German government by issuing a new mark after the hyperinflation completely devaluates the old mark.
 10 October – An international loan is granted to Germany to help the reconstruction of Germany's economy and industry.
 18–30 November – France and Belgium return control of the Ruhr to Germany in the Occupation of the Ruhr.
 7 December – German federal election, December 1924

 German company Hugo Boss was founded.

Popular culture

Arts and literature
Thomas Mann's novel Der Zauberberg (The Magic Mountain) is published.
Kurt Hielscher's photographic album Deutschland: Baukunst und Landschaft (Germany: Architecture and Landscapes) is published.
Forbidden Paradise, starring Pola Negri, Rod La Rocque, and Adolphe Menjou, is released by director Ernst Lubitsch.
The Last Laugh, starring Emil Jannings, is released by director F.W. Murnau.
Waxworks, starring William Dieterle, Emil Jannings, Conrad Veidt, and Werner Krauss, is released by director Paul Leni.
The opera Intermezzo is first performed by Richard Strauss in Dresden, Germany.
Artist Kurt Schwitters creates the Merz 32 collage.
 Die Häschenschule a children's book written by Albert Sixtus and illustrated by Fritz Koch-Gotha is published.

Sports

Births

 3 January – Otto Beisheim, German businessman (died 2013)
 4 January – Marianne Werner, German athlete
 15 January – Georg Ratzinger, German priest and conductor (died 2020)
 3 February – Friedrich Wilhelm, Prince of Hohenzollern, German nobleman (died 2010)
 12 February – Karl-Heinz Kipp, German entrepreneur (died 2017)
 4 March – Gert Boyle, German-born American businesswoman (died 2019)
 11 March – Peter Scholl-Latour, German journalist (died 2014)
 15 March – Walter Gotell, German actor (died 1997)
 27 March – Herbert Zangs, German artist (died 2003)
 8 April – Günter Pfitzmann, German actor (died 2003)
 10 April – Wolfgang Menge, German television director and journalist (died 2012)
 23 April – Ruth Leuwerik, German film actress (died 2016)
 3 May – Yehuda Amichai, German-born Israeli poet (died 2000)
 4 May – Hans-Günther Thalheim, German Germanist and linguist (died 2018)
 12 May – Jürgen Dethloff, German engineer (died 2002)
 14 May – Coco Schumann, jazz musician (died 2018)
 23 May – Karlheinz Deschner, German writer (died 2014)	
 31 May – Gisela May, German actress and singer (died 2016)
 3 June – Günther Rühle, German theatre critic (died 2021)
 4 June – Heinz Westphal, German politician (died 1998)
 10 June – Friedrich L. Bauer, German computer scientist (died 2015)
 20 June – Rainer Barzel, German politician (died 2006)
 5 July – Niels Jannasch, German-born Canadian historian and museum curator (died 2001)	
 25 July – Arnold Weiss, German-born American soldier ((died 2010)
 15 August – Werner Abrolat, German actor (died 1997)
 16 August  – Ralf Bendix, German Schlager singer, music producer, composer and songwriter (died 2014)
 18 August – Armin, Prince of Lippe, German nobleman (died 2015)
 2 September – Wolfgang Zeidler, German judge (died 1987)
 4 September – Helmut Schlesinger, German economist
 15 October – Marguerite Andersen, German-Canadian author and educator (died 2022)
 6 November – Jeanette Schmid, Czech-born entertainer (died 2005)
 18 November – Elfie Pertramer, German actress (died 2011)
 30 November – Otto Kaiser, German biblical scholar (died 2017)
 6 December – Meinrad Miltenberger, German canoeist (died 1993)
 11 December – Heinz Schenk, German actor and television presenter (died 2014)
 15 December – Esther Béjarano, German member of the Women's Orchestra of Auschwitz

Deaths
 20 January – Franz Dibelius, German Protestant theologian (born 1847)
 27 February – Hans Georg Friedrich Groß, German balloonist and airship constructor (born 1860)
 20 March – Adolf von Scholz, German politician (born 1833)
 10 April – Hugo Stinnes, German industrialist and politician. (born 1870)
 23 April – Karl Helfferich, German politician (born 1872)
 25 April – Ernst Büchner, German chemist (born 1850)
 11 August – Franz Heinrich Schwechten, German architect (born 1841)	
 10 October – Carl von Thieme, German banker (born 1844)
 2 December – Hugo von Seeliger, German astronomer (born 1849)

References

 
Years of the 20th century in Germany
1920s in Germany
Germany
Germany